Route 155 or Highway 155 may refer to:

Canada 
  Prince Edward Island Route 155 (Thompson Road)
  Quebec Route 155
  Saskatchewan Highway 155
  Winnipeg Route 155

Costa Rica
 National Route 155

Japan
 Japan National Route 155

United States 
 Interstate 155
 U.S. Route 155 (former proposal)
 Alabama State Route 155
 Arkansas Highway 155
 California State Route 155
 Connecticut Route 155
 Florida State Road 155
 Georgia State Route 155
 Illinois Route 155
 Kentucky Route 155
 Louisiana Highway 155
 Maine State Route 155
 Maryland Route 155
 M-155 (Michigan highway)
 New Hampshire Route 155
 New Hampshire Route 155A
 New Jersey Route 155 (former)
 New York State Route 155
 Ohio State Route 155
 Pennsylvania Route 155
 Tennessee State Route 155
 Texas State Highway 155
 Texas State Highway Loop 155
 Farm to Market Road 155 (Texas)
 Utah State Route 155
 Vermont Route 155
 Virginia State Route 155
 Washington State Route 155
 Wisconsin Highway 155
Territories
 Puerto Rico Highway 155